Henan Jiangbei province (河南江北行省), also referred to as just Henan, was a province (Branch Secretariat) of the Yuan dynasty in China established in 1268. It included the modern Henan, northern Jiangsu, and part of Anhui. The capital was Bianliang (Kaifeng).

See also
 Administrative divisions of the Yuan dynasty
 Yang Province
 Viceroy of Liangjiang
 Jiangnan Province

References

Provinces of the Yuan dynasty
1268 establishments